was a Japanese samurai of the Ashikaga clan during the Sengoku period of Japan's history.

Yoshitsuna was the brother of Ashikaga Yoshiharu who was the 12th shōgun of the Muromachi shogunate.  Both men were sons of Ashikaga Yoshizumi, who was the 11th Ashikaga shōgun.

Yoshitsuna was adopted as heir of the 10th shōgun, Ashikaga Yoshitane, but he was never elevated to this leadership role.

Yoshitsuna was the father of the 14th shōgun, Ashikaga Yoshihide.

Notes

References
 Berry, Mary Elizabeth. (1994). The Culture of Civil War in Kyoto. Berkeley: University of California Press. ;  OCLC 27812307
 Yamasaki, Shigehisa. (1981). Chronological Table of Japanese Art (英文曰本美術年表).  Tokyo: Geishinsha.  OCLC 8399520

Yoshitsune
1509 births
1573 deaths